This is a list of Algerian saints, blesseds, venerables, and Servants of God, as recognized by the Catholic Church. These people were born, died, or lived their religious life in the present territory of Algeria.

Catholicism had reached Algeria within the first centuries of Christianity.  Though interrupted by the Muslim conquest, from ancient times, through the period of French rule, and into the present time, Algeria has had an active Catholic presence.  Aside from Egypt, and possibly Tunisia, Algeria accounts for the most known saints of any individual country in Africa.

Before the Arab Conquest

While Catholicism reached northern Africa during Roman times, the Roman borders did not exactly match modern ones.  Some saints, particularly of Berber origin, may have been more closely associated with parts of modern Tunisia or Libya.  This is a partial list of early saints certainly or probably associated with modern Algeria.

Popes

 Pope Victor I (r. 189–199)
 Pope Miltiades (r. 311–314)
 Pope Gelasius I (r. 492–496)

Writers and theologians

 Augustine of Hippo, Doctor of the Church
 Optatus, author against Donatism
 Possidius, author of a life of Augustine of Hippo

Others

 Adrian of Canterbury, of North Africa
 Alypius of Thagaste
 Arcadius of Mauretania
 Cerbonius, of North Africa
 Crispina
 Donatian and companions, of North Africa
 Fabius
 Marciana of Mauretania
 Marcellinus, Vincent, and Domninus, of North Africa
 Marianus, James, and companions
 Maximilian of Tebessa
 Monica of Hippo
 Nemesian and companions
 Typasius
 Zeno of Verona

Modern times

In 1000, the privilege of naming saints was reserved to Rome.  As Christianity returned to northern Africa (outside Egypt) in the latter half of the second millennium, the identities and histories of the Algerian saints has become more clear.

List of saints

 Serapion of Algiers, Mercedarian religious and martyr (canonized 1728)
 Charles de Foucauld, religious and martyr

List of blesseds

 Martyrs of Algeria, Trappists and martyrs
 Francesco Zirano, Franciscan priest and martyr

List of venerables

(There are not currently any Algerian Venerables)

List of Servants of God

 Bernardo de Monroy and two companions, Trinitarian priests and martyrs

See also

Congregation for the Causes of Saints
List of Muslim saints of Algeria
Catholic Church in Africa

Sources 

 "Hagiography Circle"
 

Algeria
Saints
Catholic Church in Algeria

Algeria
Algeria
Algeria
Saints
Saints